Rejectionism or rejectionist may refer to:

A policy or attitude of rejection of something
Rejectionists, Iraqi insurgent group
Rejectionist Front, Palestinian political coalition
Rafida, an Islamic term, "those who reject"
Epistemic rejectionism, a philosophical position